Author: The JT LeRoy Story is a 2016 documentary film about American writer Laura Albert and her literary persona JT LeRoy. It examines the critical acclaim given the JT LeRoy books and their international popularity, and the subsequent scandal when it was revealed that LeRoy did not exist and Albert had written the books. Jeff Feuerzeig, the film's writer/director, told Kevin Lally of Film Journal International, “I thought it was the wildest story about story I had ever heard,” and noted, “one voice glaringly missing from all these accounts [was] the voice of the author of the fiction on and off the page, Laura Albert. She had held her story back, and I said: Wow! That’s the voice I would like to hear.”

The film premiered at the Sundance Film Festival in 2016.

Reception

Critical response
On Rotten Tomatoes the film has an approval rating of 77% based on 92 reviews. The site's critical consensus reads, "Author: The JT LeRoy Story serves as a worthy primer on its fascinating subject as well as an insightful look at the ever-evolving nature of modern celebrity." On Metacritic the film has a score of 72 out of 100, based on reviews from 24 critics.

Awards and nominations

References

External links
 

2016 documentary films
2016 films
American documentary films